Tara Bryan (1953-2020) was an American born Canadian artist known for her paintings and book art.

Bryan née Tidwell was born in Cuero, Texas on October 14, 1953. She studied at the University of New Mexico and the University of Wisconsin–Madison. In 1992 Bryan moved to Newfoundland. She created walking bird press to publish her artist's books.

She created several paintings of icebergs. One of those images was recreated as a mural on the facade of St. John's Convention Centre.

In 2010 Bryan was a recipient of a Long Haul Award from the Visual Artists Newfoundland and Labrador-CARFAC. In 2021 the same organization posthumously awarded her the Endurance Award. She was elected to the Royal Canadian Academy of Arts in 2012.

Her work is in the Victoria and Albert Museum  and the National Museum of Women in the Arts.

Bryan died on September 29, 2020.

References

1953 births
2020 deaths
Women book artists
Book artists
20th-century Canadian women artists
People from Cuero, Texas